Warnham & Rusper is an electoral division of West Sussex in the United Kingdom and returns one member to sit on West Sussex County Council. The current County Councillor, Mick Hodgson, is also Vice-Chairman of West Sussex County Council.

Extent
The division covers the villages of Colgate, Faygate, Kingsfold, Lambs Green, Rowhook, Rudgwick, Rusper, Slinfold, Tisman's Common, Warnham and Winterfold.

It comprises the following Horsham District wards: the north part of Itchingfield, Slinfold & Warnham Ward, Rudgwick Ward and Rusper & Colgate Ward; and of the following civil parishes: Colgate, Rudgwick, Rusper, Slinfold and Warnham.

Between the 2005 and 2009 boundary changes took place which transferred village of Broadbridge Heath  to the newly created Division of Horsham Tanbridge & Broadbridge Heath and transferred the Parish of Colgate form the Division Billingshurst  of in to the Division.

On 23 August 2013 Mick Hodgson died, this necessitated the holding of a bye-election, which was held on 24 October 2013

Election results

2013 Bye-election
Results of the bye-election held on 24 October 2013:

2013 Election
Results of the election held on 2 May 2013:

2009 Election
The latest election took place on 4 June 2009:

2005 Election
Results of the election held on 5 May 2005:

References

Election Results - West Sussex County Council

External links
 West Sussex County Council
 Election Maps

Electoral Divisions of West Sussex